The  Quad Cities Waterfront Convention Center is a convention center located in Bettendorf, Iowa, United States. 

The name for the facility in the development stages was the Bettendorf Events Center. A ground breaking ceremony for the center was held on October 6, 2006.  Construction was delayed in late 2006 because the project was $2 million over budget and the Isle of Capri, who was to operate the facility for the city, was completing a marketing study.  Once construction got underway it was completed in early 2009.  

The facility contains  of space, which includes a  ballroom and eight private meeting rooms.   The convention center is owned by the city of Bettendorf and is operated by the Isle of Capri Casino & Hotel, which is connected by way of a skywalk.

References

External links
 Official website

Event venues established in 2009 
Modernist architecture in Iowa
Bettendorf, Iowa
Convention centers in Iowa
Tourist attractions in the Quad Cities
Buildings and structures in Scott County, Iowa
Tourist attractions in Scott County, Iowa